Regius Professorship of Physiology is a Regius Chair at the University of Glasgow that was founded in 1839 by Queen Victoria. It was originally titled the Regius Chair of Theory of Physic or Institutes of Medicine but the name changed to Regius Chair of Physiology in 1893.

List of Regius Professors of Physiology

 1839 to 1876: Andrew Buchanan
 1876 to 1906: John Gray McKendrick
 1906 to 1928: Noel Paton
 1928 to 1947: Edward Provan Cathcart
 1947 to 1970: Robert Campbell Garry
 1971 to 1990: Otto Hutter
 1991 to 2012: John Christie (Ian) McGrath
 2012 to present: Tomasz Guzik

References

1839 establishments in Scotland
Physiology Glasgow
Professorships at the University of Glasgow